The 2010 NASCAR Sprint Cup Series was the 62nd season of professional stock car racing in the United States, the 39th modern-era cup series, and the first Cup season of the 2010s, the 21st century's second decade. Beginning at Daytona International Speedway, the season included 36 races and two exhibition races. The season concluded with the 2010 Ford 400 at Homestead-Miami Speedway. During the 2009 offseason, NASCAR announced a few calendar changes, including the standardized start time. Rick Hendrick won the Owners' Championship, while Jimmie Johnson won the Drivers' Championship with a second-place finish at the final race of the season. Chevrolet won the Manufacturers' Championship with 261 points. Johnson extended his record of consecutive championships with the 5th title in a row. 2010 is the first season without drivers Jeremy Mayfield since 1992 and Sterling Marlin since 1975.

Teams and drivers

Complete schedule
There were 43 full-time teams in 2010.

Limited schedule

Team changes
Roush Fenway Racing removed one of their cars because of the five to four car maximum rule.
Richard Petty Motorsports and Yates Racing merged to form one team. Richard Petty Motorsports switched from Dodges after the merger to Yates Racing with Fords.
Richard Childress Racing removed one of their cars to form a three car team.

Driver changes
Martin Truex Jr. left Earnhardt Ganassi Racing's No. 1 car to drive for Michael Waltrip Racing's No. 56 in 2010, replacing Michael Waltrip, who ran a partial schedule with the team's No. 51 and Prism Motorsports No. 55. Truex Jr. signed a multi-year agreement, with options for further years.
Jamie McMurray moved from Roush Fenway Racing to replace Truex Jr. in the No. 1 for Earnhardt Ganassi Racing.

Rule changes
It was announced in January as part of the annual preseason media tour in Charlotte that, after years of restrictions, drivers would be let loose as it were, popularly referred to as "Boys, Have At It". Rules were altered to allow for "bump drafting", especially at Daytona and Talladega. On February 10, the green-white-checker finish rule was altered in all three major series (including the Nationwide and Camping World Truck Series) to allow for up to three attempts for said finish. Starting with the Shelby American, NASCAR extended its post-race inspections to include the first car out of the race that was not involved in a wreck; in other words, the first start and park.

At Martinsville, spoilers returned to the Car of Tomorrow after the finish of the 2009 Aaron's 499 that saw Carl Edwards' car becoming airborne and flying into the catch fencing after colliding with eventual winner Brad Keselowski on the last turn.

Hall of Fame opens

On May 11, the NASCAR Hall of Fame was officially opened in Charlotte, North Carolina.  The three-story building houses historic artifacts, interactive displays and the shrine for inductees.  The Charter Class of 2010 — made up of seven-time champions Richard Petty and Dale Earnhardt, NASCAR founder Bill France Sr., his son and owner/driver Junior Johnson — were inducted on May 23.

Schedule
The final schedule was released on September 15, 2009.

Calendar changes
 For the 2010 season, all races adopted standardized start times; east coast day races began at 1:00 pm. ET, west coast day races began at 12:00 pm. PT (3:00 pm. ET), and most night races began at 7:30 pm. ET. These changes were intended to alleviate fan confusion over the inconsistent scheduling practices of previous seasons, allow teams a "shorter" race day due to the earlier start times, and to provide more "flexibility" in the event of rain delays. The Coca-Cola 600 maintained its traditional early-evening start time, while the Coke Zero 400 was delayed due to weather.
 The Autism Speaks 400 was moved before the NASCAR Sprint All-Star Race and the Coca-Cola 600.
 The Subway Fresh Fit 600 and Samsung Mobile 500 switched their dates.

Broadcasting

United States
Fox Sports, their corporate sibling Speed, TNT, and ESPN/ABC are in the fourth year of a seven-year television contract scheduled to expire after the 2014 season. Showtime is going to show a highlights show for the first time.

Fox
Fox Sports broadcast the first 13 races, including the Budweiser Shootout, the 52nd Daytona 500, and the Coca-Cola 600. With Dover moving to mid-May, Fox ended their coverage with the 51st Coca-Cola 600. The Sprint All-Star Race XXVI along with the Gatorade Duels, practice sessions, and all qualifying and practice sessions (except for Daytona qualifying, which aired on Fox) were all broadcast on Speed. The network's Gopher Cam mascot, Digger, returned for on-screen displays.

TNT
Time Warner's Turner Sports division (through TNT) broadcast the next six races, including the Coke Zero 400 at Daytona in its limited commercial interruption wide open coverage format. That race will also be telecast in 3-D on both NASCAR.com and DirecTV. TNT's coverage will begin with the June Pocono race and end with Chicagoland. Qualifying and practice sessions will remain on Speed. Adam Alexander will be the new lead announcer, with Lindsay Czarniak hosting pre-and-post-race shows, replacing Bill Weber and Marc Fein respectively.

ESPN/ABC
ESPN carried the remaining races, beginning with the Brickyard 400. ABC, which formerly carried the last 11 races of the season, will carry the Saturday night races in Bristol, Richmond, and Charlotte. Although previously races could not be moved from ABC to ESPN, early start times and ABC's plans to expand its Sunday morning political shows meant that NASCAR had to allow most Chase races to move to ESPN. This was met from criticism from most of ABC's southern-based affiliates, who had originally counted on NASCAR on those Sundays for ratings gains against the NFL.

Most qualifying sessions will air on ESPN2, practice sessions and some qualifying will be shared by SPEED and ESPN2. Qualifying for the Pep Boys Auto 500 and AMP Energy 500 air on Speed because they are Saturday afternoon sessions during the college football season. Additionally, Jerry Punch was replaced in the play-by-play position by Marty Reid; Punch will return to the pits where he worked at ESPN until 2000.

Showtime
CBS-owned pay cable premium service Showtime carried a weekly one-hour highlight show titled Inside NASCAR every Wednesday at 10 pm ET/PT, with the series premiere on February 10.  Chris Myers, who also hosts FOX's NASCAR coverage, will serve as host, joined by SPEED's Randy Pemberton & Michael Waltrip, and ESPN's Brad Daugherty, with the shows taping at the NASCAR Hall of Fame Studio 43.  38 episodes are planned, covering the season.

Radio
On radio, Sirius XM Radio carried all races in the series.  Terrestrial radio rights are being handled as follows:
 Motor Racing Network carried races at tracks owned by their corporate sibling, International Speedway Corporation as well as the races at Dover and Pocono and the All-Star Race at Charlotte;
 Speedway Motorsports, Inc.-owned Performance Racing Network carried events from those SMI tracks, and will jointly produced the Allstate 400 at the Brickyard with the Indianapolis Motor Speedway Radio Network.

Other North American channels
In Canada, TSN and TSN 2 will have full coverage for the 2010 season.

International
In Australia, Fox Sports showed all Sprint Cup races live across their networks. Network Ten also showed races on its digital sports multichannel, ONE.

In Portugal, all races from the 2010 season were telecast on SportTv 3, while in Sweden, Viasat Motor televised the races.

In nearby Finland, Nelonen Sport Pro telecasted the season's events.

In Spain, Teledeporte telecasted six races of the season.

In Latin America, Speed Channel broadcast all Sprint Cup races and Nationwide races live.

In France, ABMoteurs broadcast all Sprint Cup races live.

In the United Kingdom, it was originally thought that Sky Sports had not secured the rights to the series for 2010. However, this changed in early February as Sky announced that they will show live coverage of the Daytona 500, with an hour-long highlights package for the rest of the races, on the Monday following each race. The remainder of the season, starting with the Shelby American, were shown on Open Access 3.

Top 35 owner's points
Beginning at Martinsville, NASCAR used the 2010 owner's points standings. Teams in the top 35 positions were guaranteed entry into the race; those below had to qualify on time.

Changes after Phoenix race: No. 7 team moves into the Top 35, replacing the No. 34 team.
Texas: The No. 34 entry moves up to 34th, No. 37 falls to 35th, No. 7 is 36th, one point out of safety (Fifteen points separate 33rd (No. 38 team) and 36th).
Talladega: No. 34 team moves up to 33rd, No. 7 is 34th, No. 38 team is 35th, No. 37 team is two points out of safety.
Richmond: Front Row Motorsports cars are 34th (No. 34), 35th (No. 37), and 36th (No. 38).
Darlington: No change in and out initially. No. 7 entry penalized 25 points for violating NASCAR rules and slips to 35th.
Dover: No. 7 and No. 38 tied, No. 37 is two points out of safety
Charlotte: Front Row Motorsports cars (No. 34, No. 37, No. 38 in order) are in Top 35, No. 7 is 15 points out
Pocono: After a 150-point penalty, the No. 38 team falls out of the Top 35, while the No. 7 moves in.

Results and standings

Races

Drivers

(key) Bold – Pole position awarded by time. Italics – Pole position set by final practice results. * – Most laps led. Bold italics – Drivers currently in "wild card" qualifying positions for the Chase.

Manufacturer

Rookie entries
The Rookie of the Year Award winner was Kevin Conway. Conway ran 28 races with a best finish of 14th. The only other competitor, Terry Cook, managed to run only three races.

See also

 2010 NASCAR Nationwide Series
 2010 NASCAR Camping World Truck Series
 2010 ARCA Racing Series
 2010 NASCAR Canadian Tire Series
 2010 NASCAR Corona Series
 2010 NASCAR Mini Stock Series

References

External links
2010 NASCAR Sprint Cup Series at ESPN
NASCAR.com
NASCAR 2010 schedule released
RacingOne 
Jayski's Silly Season Site
Speed Channel
ThatsRacin.com
2010 Sprint Cup Series schedule
Racing-Reference.info

 
NASCAR Cup Series seasons